Zodarion remotum is a spider species found in Corsica and Italy.

See also 
 List of Zodariidae species

References

External links 

remotum
Spiders of Europe
Spiders described in 1935